Meyers Hill is a summit in the U.S. state of Oregon.

Meyers Hill was named in 1875 after one August Meyer.

References

Mountains of Jackson County, Oregon
Mountains of Oregon